Chen Cheng (1365–1457), courtesy name Zilu (子鲁), pseudonym Zhushan (竹山), was a Chinese diplomat known for his overland journeys into Central Asia during the Ming dynasty. His travels were contemporaneous to the treasure voyages of the admiral Zheng He.

Life
Chen was born in 1365 in Linchuan County, Jiangxi province. He obtained the positions of juren (举人) and jinshi (贡士) in 1393 and 1394 respectively after taking the imperial examination.

In 1396, Chen was sent on a diplomatic mission to the western region of Qaidam to establish border defence. In 1397, he was sent by the Hongwu Emperor as an envoy to Vietnam. From 1406 to 1411, he served in the Wenyuange (文渊阁), the imperial library in the Forbidden City, as an editor of the Yongle Encyclopedia.

Buddhist idols and temples in Turfan were described in 1414 by Chen Cheng.

In 1414, 1416 and 1420, Chen Cheng led a Ming mission to the court of the Timurid dynasty at Samarkand.

Works by Chen Cheng 
 Travel in the Western Region
 Xi yu fan guo zhi, "A Record of the Barbarian Countries in the Western Region."

See also
 Ghiyāth al-dīn Naqqāsh, the diarist of Shahrukh's embassy to the Yongle Emperor's court (1420–1422).
 Ruy Gonzáles de Clavijo, another diplomat – from Spain – who visited Samarkand a few years before Chen Cheng.

Notes

References 
 F. J. Hecker, A fifteenth-century Chinese diplomat in Herat, Journal of the Royal Asiatic Society, 3rd series p85-91, 1993.
 
 

 

14th-century Chinese people
15th-century Chinese people
Ming dynasty writers
Ming dynasty diplomats
1365 births
1457 deaths
Chinese explorers
14th-century diplomats
People from Fuzhou, Jiangxi